Luis Eduardo González (21 October 1925 – 24 July 2019) was a Colombian swimmer. He competed in two events at the 1948 Summer Olympics.

References

External links

1925 births
2019 deaths
Place of birth missing
Colombian male swimmers
Olympic swimmers of Colombia
Swimmers at the 1948 Summer Olympics
Competitors at the 1946 Central American and Caribbean Games
Central American and Caribbean Games gold medalists for Colombia
Central American and Caribbean Games medalists in swimming
20th-century Colombian people
21st-century Colombian people